Tmesisternus elvirae is a species of beetle in the family Cerambycidae. It was described by Weigel in 2004. It is known from Papua New Guinea.

References

elvirae
Beetles described in 2004